Gustav Vasa may refer to:

 Gustav I of Sweden, King of Sweden from 1523 to 1560
 MV Gustav Vasa, a ferry that operated between Sweden and Germany
 Gustavus Vassa (Olaudah Equiano), prominent African involved in the abolition of the slave trade